"Romancing the Stone" is a song written, recorded and produced by Eddy Grant, who released it from his 1984 album Going for Broke.  It was intended for the 1984 feature film of the same name, in fact was announced by Casey Kasem on the 30 June 1984 edition of American Top 40 as the title song to the movie, but ultimately was used only briefly in the film. Clips from the film appeared in at least one official music video for the song, and the song is mentioned in the film's closing credits.

In the United States, the song reached number 26 on the Billboard Hot 100 and number 22 on Cash Box during the summer of that year.  It was a much bigger hit in Canada, where it reached number seven.  It was also a hit internationally, narrowly missing the Top 40 in Germany and the UK, but reaching number 28 in New Zealand.

"Romancing the Stone" was a hit on two other US charts.  On the soul chart it went to No. 68, and on the dance charts, it peaked at No. 12.

Chart history

Weekly charts

Year-end charts

References

1984 songs
1984 singles
Eddy Grant songs
EMI Records singles
Funk songs
Music videos directed by Steve Barron
Parlophone singles
Portrait Records singles
Songs written by Eddy Grant